The recorded history of the Dominican Republic began in 1492 when the Genoa-born navigator Christopher Columbus, working for the Crown of Castile, happened upon a large island in the region of the western Atlantic Ocean that later came to be known as the Caribbean. It was inhabited by the Taíno, an Arawakan people, who called the eastern part of the island Quisqueya (Kiskeya), meaning "mother of all lands." Columbus promptly claimed the island for the Spanish Crown, naming it La Isla Española ("the Spanish Island"), later Latinized to Hispaniola. The Taínos were nearly wiped out due to European infectious diseases. Other causes were abuse, suicide, the breakup of family, famine, the encomienda system, which resembled a feudal system in Medieval Europe, war with the Castilians, changes in lifestyle, and mixing with other peoples. Laws passed for the Indians' protection (beginning with the Laws of Burgos, 1512–13) were never truly enforced.

What would become the Dominican Republic was the Spanish Captaincy General of Santo Domingo until 1821, except for a time as a French colony from 1795 to 1809. It was then part of a unified Hispaniola with Haiti from 1822 until 1844. In 1844, Dominican independence was proclaimed and the republic, which was often known as Santo Domingo until the early 20th century, maintained its independence except for a short Spanish occupation from 1861 to 1865 and occupation by the United States from 1916 to 1924. During the 19th century, Dominicans were often at war, fighting the French, Haitians, Spanish, or amongst themselves, resulting in a society heavily influenced by caudillos, who ruled the country as if it were their personal kingdom. Between 1844 and 1914, the Dominican Republic had 53 presidents (of whom only 3 had completed their terms) and 19 constitutions. Most came to power through the barrel of a gun and left the same way.

Around 1930, the Dominican Republic found itself under the control of the dictator Rafael Trujillo, who ruled the country until his assassination in 1961. Juan Bosch was elected president in 1962 but was deposed in a military coup in 1963. In 1965, the United States led an intervention in the midst of a bloody civil war sparked by an uprising to restore Bosch. In 1966, the caudillo Joaquín Balaguer defeated Bosch in the presidential election. Balaguer maintained a tight grip on power for most of the next 30 years when U.S. reaction to flawed elections forced him to curtail his term in 1996. Since then, regular competitive elections have been held in which opposition candidates have won the presidency.

Pre-European history

The Taíno people called the island Quisqueya (mother of all lands) and Ayiti (land of high mountains). At the time of Columbus' arrival in 1492, the island's territory consisted of five chiefdoms: Marién, Maguá, Maguana, Jaragua, and Higüey. These were ruled respectively by caciques Guacanagarix, Guarionex, Caonabo, Bohechío, and Cayacoa.

Spanish colony: 1492–1795

Arrival of the Spanish
Christopher Columbus reached the island of Hispañola on his first voyage, in December 1492. Guacanagarí, the chief who hosted Columbus and his men, treated them kindly and provided them with everything they desired. However, the Taínos' egalitarian social system clashed with the Europeans' feudalist system, which had more rigid class structures. The Europeans believed the Taínos to be either weak or misleading, and they began to treat the tribes with violence. Columbus successfully tempered this trend, and he and his men departed from Ayiti, the Taínos' name for the island, on good terms.

After the sinking of the Santa María, Columbus established a small fort to support his claim to the island. The fort was called La Navidad because the shipwrecking and the founding of the fort occurred on Christmas Day. While Columbus was away, the garrison manning the fort was wracked by divisions that evolved into conflict. The more rapacious men began to terrorize the Taíno, the Ciguayo, and the Macorix peoples, which included attempts to take their women. Guacanagarix tried to reach an accommodation with the Spaniards; however, the Spaniards and some of his own people viewed him as weak. The Spaniards treated him with contempt, including the kidnapping of some of his wives. Fed up, the powerful Cacique Caonabo of the Maguana Chiefdom attacked the Europeans and destroyed La Navidad. Guacanagarix was dismayed by these events but did not try hard to aid the Europeans, probably hoping that the troublesome outsiders would never return.

In 1493, Columbus came back to the island on his second voyage and founded the first Spanish colony in the New World, the city of La Isabela. Isabela nearly failed because of hunger and disease. In 1496, Santo Domingo was built and became the new capital, and remains the oldest continuously inhabited European city in the Americas.

An estimated 400,000 Tainos living on the island were soon enslaved to work in gold mines. By 1508, their numbers had decreased to around 60,000 because of forced labor, hunger, disease, and mass killings. By 1535, only a few dozen were still alive.

During this period, the colony's Spanish leadership changed several times. When Columbus departed on another exploration, Francisco de Bobadilla became governor. Settlers' allegations of mismanagement by Columbus helped create a tumultuous political situation. In 1502, Nicolás de Ovando replaced de Bobadilla as governor, with an ambitious plan to expand Spanish influence in the region. It was he who dealt most brutally with the Taíno people. The Taino population declined by up to 95% in the century after the Spanish arrival, from a pre contact population of tens of thousands to 8,000,000. Many authors have described the treatment of the Taino in Hispaniola under the Spanish Empire as genocide.

The conquistador-turned-priest Bartolomé de las Casas wrote an eyewitness history of the Spanish incursion into the island of Hispaniola that reported the conquistadors' almost feral misconduct:

One rebel, however, successfully fought back. Enriquillo led a group who fled to the mountains and attacked the Spanish repeatedly for fourteen years. The Spanish ultimately offered him a peace treaty and gave Enriquillo and his followers their own town in 1534. The town lasted only a few years. Rebellious slaves burned it to the ground and killed all who stayed behind.

Sixteenth century
In 1501, the Spanish monarchs, Ferdinand I and Isabella, first granted permission to the colonists of the Caribbean to import African slaves, who began arriving to the island in 1503. In 1510, the first sizable shipment, consisting of 250 Black Ladinos, arrived in Hispaniola from Spain. Eight years later African-born slaves arrived in the West Indies. The Colony of Santo Domingo was organized as the Royal Audiencia of Santo Domingo in 1511. Sugar cane was introduced to Hispaniola from the Canary Islands, and the first sugar mill in the New World was established in 1516, on Hispaniola. The need for a labor force to meet the growing demands of sugar cane cultivation led to an exponential increase in the importation of slaves over the following two decades. The sugar mill owners soon formed a new colonial elite and convinced the Spanish king to allow them to elect the members of the Real Audiencia from their ranks. Poorer colonists subsisted by hunting the herds of wild cattle that roamed throughout the island and selling their hides.

The first major slave revolt in the Americas occurred in Santo Domingo on December 25, 1521, when enslaved Muslims of the Wolof nation led an uprising in the sugar plantation of admiral Don Diego Colon, son of Christopher Columbus. Many of these insurgents managed to escape to the mountains where they formed independent maroon communities, but the Admiral had a lot of the captured rebels hanged.

While sugar cane dramatically increased Spain's earnings on the island, large numbers of the newly imported slaves fled into the nearly impassable mountain ranges in the island's interior, joining the growing communities of cimarrónes—literally, 'wild animals'. By the 1530s, cimarrón bands had become so numerous that in rural areas the Spaniards could only safely travel outside their plantations in large armed groups. When Archdeacon Alonso de Castro toured Hispaniola in 1542, he estimated the maroon population at 2,000–3,000 persons, living mainly on the Cape of San Nicolas, in the Ciguayos, on the Samana peninsular, and on the Cape of Iguey. Latter that decade, there were also rebellions of enslaved people, led by Diego de Guzman, Diego de Campo, and Captain Lemba.

Beginning in the 1520s, the Caribbean Sea was raided by increasingly numerous French pirates. In 1541, Spain authorized the construction of Santo Domingo's fortified wall, and in 1560 decided to restrict sea travel to enormous, well-armed convoys. In another move, which would destroy Hispaniola's sugar industry, in 1561 Havana, more strategically located in relation to the Gulf Stream, was selected as the designated stopping point for the merchant flotas, which had a royal monopoly on commerce with the Americas. In 1564, the island's main inland cities Santiago de los Caballeros and Concepción de la Vega were destroyed by an earthquake. In the 1560s, English privateers joined the French in regularly raiding Spanish shipping in the Americas.

With the conquest of the American mainland, Hispaniola quickly declined. Most Spanish colonists left for the silver-mines of Mexico and Peru, while new immigrants from Spain bypassed the island. Agriculture dwindled, new imports of slaves ceased, and white colonists, free blacks, and slaves alike lived in poverty, weakening the racial hierarchy and aiding intermixing, resulting in a population of predominantly mixed Spaniard, African, and Taíno descent. Except for the city of Santo Domingo, which managed to maintain some legal exports, Dominican ports were forced to rely on contraband trade, which, along with livestock, became the sole source of livelihood for the island dwellers.

In 1586, the privateer Francis Drake of England captured the city of Santo Domingo, collecting a ransom for its return to Spanish rule. In 1592, Christopher Newport of England attacked the town of Azua on the bay of Ocoa, which was taken and plundered.

In 1595, the Spanish, frustrated by the twenty-year rebellion of their Dutch subjects, closed their home ports to rebel shipping from the Netherlands cutting them off from the critical salt supplies necessary for their herring industry. The Dutch responded by sourcing new salt supplies from Spanish America where colonists were more than happy to trade. So large numbers of Dutch traders and buccaneers joined their English and French counterparts on the Spanish Main.

Seventeenth century

In 1605, Spain was infuriated that Spanish settlements on the northern and western coasts of the island were carrying out large scale and illegal trade with the Dutch, who were at that time fighting a war of independence against Spain in Europe, and the English, a very recent enemy state, and so decided to forcibly resettle the colony's inhabitants closer to the city of Santo Domingo. This action, known as the Devastaciones de Osorio, proved disastrous; more than half of the resettled colonists died of starvation or disease, over 100,000 cattle were abandoned, and many slaves escaped.  Five of the existing thirteen settlements on the island were brutally razed by Spanish troops – many of the inhabitants fought, escaped to the jungle, or fled to the safety of passing Dutch ships. The settlements of La Yaguana, and Bayaja, on the west and north coasts respectively of modern-day Haiti were burned, as were the settlements of Monte Cristi and Puerto Plata on the north coast and San Juan de la Maguana in the southwestern area of the modern-day Dominican Republic.

French and English buccaneers took advantage of Spain's retreat into a corner of Hispaniola to settle the island of Tortuga, off the northwest coast of Hispaniola, in 1629. France established direct control in 1640, reorganizing it into an official colony and expanding to the north coast of Hispaniola itself, whose western end Spain ceded to France in 1697 under the Treaty of Ryswick.

In 1655, Oliver Cromwell of England dispatched a fleet, commanded by Admiral Sir William Penn, to capture Santo Domingo. After meeting heavy resistance, the English retreated. Despite the fact that the English were defeated in their attempt to capture the island, they nevertheless captured the nearby Spanish colony of Jamaica, and other foreign strongholds subsequently began to be established throughout the West Indies. Madrid sought to contest such encroachments on its own imperial control by using Santo Domingo as a forward military base, but Spanish power was by now too depleted to recapture lost colonies. The city itself was furthermore subjected to a smallpox epidemic, cacao blight, and hurricane in 1666; another storm two years later; a second epidemic in 1669; a third hurricane in September 1672; plus an earthquake in May 1673 that killed twenty-four residents.

Eighteenth century

The House of Bourbon replaced the House of Habsburg in Spain in 1700 and introduced economic reforms that gradually began to revive trade in Santo Domingo. The crown progressively relaxed the rigid controls and restrictions on commerce between Spain and the colonies and among the colonies. The last flotas sailed in 1737; the monopoly port system was abolished shortly thereafter. By the middle of the century, the population was bolstered by emigration from the Canary Islands, resettling the northern part of the colony and planting tobacco in the Cibao Valley, and importation of slaves was renewed. The population of Santo Domingo grew from about 6,000 in 1737 to approximately 125,000 in 1790. Of this number, about 40,000 were white landowners, about 25,000 were mulatto freedmen, and some 60,000 were slaves. However, it remained poor and neglected, particularly in contrast with its western, French neighbor Saint-Domingue, which became the wealthiest colony in the New World and had half a million inhabitants.

When the War of Jenkins' Ear broke out in 1739, Spanish privateers, including those from Santo Domingo, began to patrol the Caribbean Sea, a development that lasted until the end of the eighteenth century. During this period, Spanish privateers from Santo Domingo sailed into enemy ports looking for ships to plunder, thus disrupting commerce between Spain's enemies in the Atlantic. As a result of these developments, Spanish privateers frequently sailed back into Santo Domingo with their holds filled with captured plunder which were sold in Hispaniola's ports, with profits accruing to individual sea raiders. The revenue acquired in these acts of piracy was invested in the economic expansion of the colony and led to repopulation from Europe.

Dominican privateers captured British, Dutch, French and Danish ships throughout the eighteenth century. Dominicans constituted one of the many diverse units which fought alongside Spanish forces under Bernardo de Gálvez during the conquest of British West Florida (1779–1781).

As restrictions on colonial trade were relaxed, the colonial elites of St. Domingue offered the principal market for Santo Domingo's exports of beef, hides, mahogany, and tobacco. With the outbreak of the Haitian Revolution in 1791, the rich urban families linked to the colonial bureaucracy fled the island, while most of the rural hateros (cattle ranchers) remained, even though they lost their principal market. Spain saw in the unrest an opportunity to seize all, or part, of the western third of the island in an alliance of convenience with the rebellious slaves. But after the slaves and French reconciled, the Spanish suffered a setback, and in 1795, France gained control of the whole island under the Treaty of Basel.

French occupation

In 1801, Toussaint Louverture arrived in Santo Domingo, proclaiming the abolition of slavery on behalf of the Haitian Republic. Shortly afterwards, Napoleon dispatched an army which subdued the whole island and ruled it for a few months. Mulattoes and blacks again rose up against these French in October 1802 and finally defeated them in November 1803. On 1 January 1804, the victors declared Saint-Domingue to be the independent republic of Haiti, the Taíno name for the entire island. Even after their defeat by the Haitians, a small French garrison remained in Santo Domingo. Slavery was reestablished and many of the émigré Spanish colonists returned. In 1805, after crowning himself Emperor, Jean-Jacques Dessalines invaded, reaching Santo Domingo before retreating in the face of a French naval squadron.

The French held on to the eastern part of the island until dealt a serious blow by the Dominican General Juan Sánchez Ramírez at the Battle of Palo Hincado on November 7, 1808. With help from the British Navy, Ramírez laid siege to the city of Santo Domingo. The French in the besieged city finally capitulated on July 9, 1809, initiating a twelve-year period of Spanish rule, known in Dominican history as "the Foolish Spain."

Spanish colony: 1809–1821

The population of the new Spanish colony stood at approximately 104,000. Of this number, about 30,000 were slaves, working predominantly on cattle ranches, and the rest a mixture of Spanish, taino and black. The European Spaniards were few, and consisted principally of Catalans and Canary Islanders.

During this period in time, the Spanish crown wielded little to no influence in the colony of Santo Domingo. Some wealthy cattle ranchers had become leaders, and sought to bring control and order in the southeast of the colony where the "law of machete" ruled the land. On December 1, 1821, the former Captain general in charge of the colony, José Núñez de Cáceres, influenced by all the Revolutions that were going on around him, finally decided to overthrow the Spanish government and proclaimed the independence of "Spanish Haiti".

The white and mulatto slave owners on the eastern part of the island—recognizing their vulnerability both to Spanish and to Haitian attack and also seeking to maintain their slaves as property—attempted to annex themselves to Gran Colombia. While this request was in transit, Jean-Pierre Boyer, the ruler of Haiti, invaded Santo Domingo on February 9, 1822, with a 10,000-strong army. Having no capacity to resist, Núñez de Cáceres surrendered the capital.

Haitian occupation 1822–1844

The twenty-two-year Haitian occupation that followed is recalled by Dominicans as a period of brutal military rule, though the reality is more complex. It led to large-scale land expropriations and failed efforts to force production of export crops, impose military services, restrict the use of the Spanish language, and eliminate traditional customs such as cockfighting. It reinforced Dominicans' perceptions of themselves as different from Haitians in "language, race, religion and domestic customs". Yet, this was also a period that definitively ended slavery as an institution in the eastern part of the island.

Haiti's constitution forbade whites from owning land, and the major landowning families were forcibly deprived of their properties. Most emigrated to the Spanish colonies of Cuba and Puerto Rico, or to independent Gran Colombia, usually with the encouragement of Haitian officials, who acquired their lands. The Haitians, who associated the Catholic Church with the French slave-masters who had exploited them before independence, confiscated all church property, deported all foreign clergy, and severed the ties of the remaining clergy to the Vatican. Santo Domingo's university, the oldest in the Western Hemisphere, lacking students, teachers, and resources, closed down. In order to receive diplomatic recognition from France and end the threat of a French invasion, Haiti was forced to pay an indemnity of 150 million francs to the former French colonists, which was subsequently lowered to 60 million francs, and Haiti imposed heavy taxes on the eastern part of the island. Since Haiti was unable to adequately provision its army, the occupying forces largely survived by commandeering or confiscating food and supplies at gunpoint.

Attempts to redistribute land conflicted with the system of communal land tenure (terrenos comuneros), which had arisen with the ranching economy, and newly emancipated slaves resented being forced to grow cash crops under Boyer's Code Rural. In rural areas, the Haitian administration was usually too inefficient to enforce its own laws. It was in the city of Santo Domingo that the effects of the occupation were most acutely felt, and it was there that the movement for independence originated.

Independence: First Republic 1844–1861

On July 16, 1838,  Juan Pablo Duarte together with Pedro Alejandrino Pina, Juan Isidro Pérez, Felipe Alfau, Benito González, Félix María Ruiz, Juan Nepumoceno Ravelo and Jacinto de la Concha founded a secret society called La Trinitaria to win independence from Haiti. A short time later, they were joined by Ramón Matías Mella, and Francisco del Rosario Sánchez. In 1843, they allied with a Haitian movement in overthrowing Boyer. Because they had revealed themselves as revolutionaries working for Dominican independence, the new Haitian president, Charles Rivière-Hérard, exiled or imprisoned the leading Trinitarios (Trinitarians). At the same time, Buenaventura Báez, an Azua mahogany exporter and deputy in the Haitian National Assembly, was negotiating with the French Consul-General for the establishment of a French protectorate. In an uprising timed to preempt Báez, on February 27, 1844, the Trinitarios declared independence from Haiti, expelling all Haitians and confiscating their property. The Trinitarios were backed by Pedro Santana, a wealthy cattle-rancher from El Seibo who commanded a private army of peons who worked on his estates.

In March 1844, Rivière-Hérard sent three columns totaling 30,000 troops to reestablish his authority. In the south, Santana defeated Rivière-Hérard at the Battle of Azua on March 19. The outnumbered Dominican forces suffered only five casualties in the battle, while the Haitians sustained over 1,000 killed. In the north, the Haitian column led by Jean-Louis Pierrot was repelled in an attack on Santiago by Dominican forces entrenched in a fort. The Haitians again suffered disproportionate casualties. Meanwhile, at sea, the Dominicans defeated the Haitians at the Battle of Tortuguero off the coast of Azua on April 15, temporarily expelling Haitian forces.

First Republic

In July 1844, Pedro Santana seized power from the liberal president Francisco del Rosario Sánchez in a military coup after Rosario Sánchez ousted the conservative Tomás Bobadilla from power. Santana inaugurated a military dictatorship with Bobadilla as a member of his junta.

The Dominican Republic's first constitution was adopted on November 6, 1844. The state was commonly known as Santo Domingo in English until the early 20th century. It featured a presidential form of government with many liberal tendencies, but it was marred by Article 210, imposed by Santana on the constitutional assembly by force, giving him the privileges of a dictatorship until the war of independence was over. These privileges not only served him to win the war but also allowed him to persecute, execute and drive into exile his political opponents, among which Duarte was the most important. Santana imprisoned and ultimately exiled Duarte to Germany. Santana made the first martyr of the republic when he had María Trinidad Sánchez executed for refusing to name "conspirators" against him.

During the first decade of independence, Haiti and the Dominican Republic were periodically at war, each invading the other in response to previous invasions. Santana used the ever-present threat of Haitian invasion as a justification for consolidating dictatorial powers. For the Dominican elite—mostly landowners, merchants and priests—the threat of re-annexation by more populous Haiti was sufficient to seek protection from a foreign power. Offering the deepwater harbor of Samaná bay as bait, over the next two decades, negotiations were made with Britain, France, the United States and Spain to declare a protectorate over the country.

The population of the Dominican Republic in 1845 was approximately 230,000 people (100,000 whites; 40,000 blacks; and 90,000 mulattoes).

Without adequate roads, the regions of the Dominican Republic developed in isolation from one another. In the south, the economy was dominated by cattle-ranching (particularly in the southeastern savannah) and cutting mahogany and other hardwoods for export. This region retained a semi-feudal character, with little commercial agriculture, the hacienda as the dominant social unit, and the majority of the population living at a subsistence level.

In the Cibao Valley, the nation's richest farmland, peasants supplemented their subsistence crops by growing tobacco for export, mainly to Germany. Tobacco required less land than cattle ranching and was mainly grown by smallholders, who relied on itinerant traders to transport their crops to Puerto Plata and Monte Cristi. Santana antagonized the Cibao farmers, enriching himself and his supporters at their expense by resorting to multiple peso printings that allowed him to buy their crops for a fraction of their value.

In 1848, Santana was forced to resign and was succeeded by his vice-president, Manuel Jimenes. After returning to lead Dominican forces against a new Haitian invasion in 1849, Santana marched on Santo Domingo, deposing Jimenes. At his behest, Congress elected Buenaventura Báez as president.

Báez immediately began an offensive campaign against Haiti; whole villages on the Haitian coast were plundered and burned, and the crews of captured ships were butchered without regard to age or gender.

In 1853, Santana was elected president for his second term, forcing Báez into exile. After repulsing the last Haitian invasion, Santana negotiated a treaty leasing a portion of Samaná Peninsula to a U.S. company; popular opposition forced him to abdicate, enabling Báez to return and seize power.

With the treasury depleted, Báez printed eighteen million uninsured pesos, purchasing the 1857 tobacco crop with this currency and exporting it for hard cash at immense profit to himself and his followers. The Cibanian tobacco planters, who were ruined when inflation ensued, revolted, recalling Santana from exile to lead their rebellion. After a year of civil war, Santana seized Santo Domingo and installed himself as president.

Spanish colony: 1861–1865

Pedro Santana inherited a bankrupt government on the brink of collapse. Having failed in his initial bids to secure annexation by the U.S. or France, Santana initiated negotiations with Queen Isabella II of Spain and the Captain-General of Cuba to have the island reconverted into a Spanish colony.

The American Civil War rendered the United States incapable of enforcing the Monroe Doctrine. In Spain, Prime Minister Don Leopoldo O'Donnell advocated renewed colonial expansion, waging a campaign in northern Morocco that conquered the city of Tétouan. In March 1861, Santana officially restored the Dominican Republic to Spain.

This move was widely rejected and there were several failed uprisings against Spanish rule. On July 4, 1861, former President Francisco del Rosario Sánchez was captured and executed by Santana after leading a failed invasion of Santo Domingo from Haiti.

War of Restoration
On August 16, 1863, a national war of restoration began in Monte Cristi Province, where the rebels defeated Spanish detachments. On September 4, Spanish reinforcements marched from Puerto Plata to relieve the besieged garrison of Santiago, defeating the rebels under the command of Gaspar Polanco and Gregorio Luperon. The rebels later burned the town and besieged the forts again. On September 14, the Spaniards abandoned Santiago and made their way to Puerto Plata harassed by guerrilla attacks that inflicted 1,300 casualties. In December 1863, a Spanish expedition sent west along the southern seacoast was successful in expelling rebel bands (already demoralized by dissensions) from San Cristobal, Bani, Azua, Barohona, Neiba, and San Juan, and driving them into Haiti.

Santana, who had been given the title of Marquess of Las Carreras by Queen Isabella II, initially was named Capitan-General of the new Spanish province, but it soon became obvious that Spanish authorities planned to deprive him of his power, leading him to resign in 1862. Condemned to death by the provisional government, Santana died of rheumatic fever in 1864.

Restrictions on trade, discrimination against the mulatto majority, Rumors to reimpose slavery, and an unpopular campaign by the new Spanish Archbishop against extramarital unions, which were widespread after decades of abandonment by the Catholic Church, all fed resentment of Spanish rule.

Confined to the major towns, Spain's largely mercenary army was unable to defeat the guerillas or contain the insurrection, and suffered heavy losses due to yellow fever. In the south, Dominican forces under José María Cabral defeated the Spanish in an open field at the Battle of La Canela on December 4, 1864.

Spanish colonial authorities encouraged Queen Isabella II to abandon the island, seeing the occupation as a nonsensical waste of troops and money. However, the rebels were in a state of political disarray and proved unable to present a cohesive set of demands. The first president of the provisional government, Pepillo Salcedo (allied with Báez) was deposed by General Gaspar Polanco in September 1864, who, in turn, was deposed by General Antonio Pimentel three months later. The rebels formalized their provisional rule by holding a national convention in February 1865, which enacted a new constitution, but the new government exerted little authority over the various regional guerrilla caudillos, who were largely independent of one another.

Unable to extract concessions from the disorganized rebels, when the American Civil War ended, in March 1865, Queen Isabella annulled the annexation and independence was restored, with the last Spanish troops departing by July.

Restoration: Second Republic 1865–1916

Second Republic
By the time the Spanish departed, most of the main towns lay in ruins and the island was divided among several dozen caudillos. José María Cabral controlled most of Barahona and the southwest with the support of Báez's mahogany-exporting partners, while cattle rancher Cesáreo Guillermo assembled a coalition of former Santanista generals in the southeast, and Gregorio Luperón controlled the north coast.

From the Spanish withdrawal to 1879, there were twenty-one changes of government and at least fifty military uprisings. In the course of these conflicts, two parties emerged. The Partido Rojo (Literally "Red Party") represented the southern cattle ranching latifundia and mahogany-exporting interests, as well as the artisans and laborers of Santo Domingo, and was dominated by Báez, who continued to seek annexation by a foreign power. The Partido Azul (literally "Blue Party"), led by Luperón, represented the tobacco farmers and merchants of the Cibao and Puerto Plata and was nationalist and liberal in orientation.

During these wars, the small and corrupt national army was far outnumbered by militias organized and maintained by local caudillos who set themselves up as provincial governors. These militias were filled out by poor farmers or landless plantation workers impressed into service who usually took up banditry when not fighting in revolution.

Within a month of the nationalist victory, Cabral, whose troops were the first to enter Santo Domingo, ousted Pimentel, but a few weeks later General Guillermo led a rebellion in support of Báez, forcing Cabral to resign and allowing Báez to retake the presidency in October.

Báez was overthrown by the Cibao farmers under Luperón, leader of the Partido Azul, the following spring, but Luperón's allies turned on each other and Cabral reinstalled himself as president in a coup in 1867. After bringing several Azules ("Blues") into his cabinet the Rojos ("Reds") revolted, returning Báez to power.

In 1869, U.S. President Ulysses S. Grant ordered U.S. Marines to the island for the first time. Dominican pirates operating from Haiti had been raiding U.S. merchant shipping in the Caribbean, and Grant directed the Marines to stop them at their source.

Following the virtual takeover of the island, Báez negotiated a treaty of annexation with the United States. Supported by U.S. Secretary of State William Seward, who hoped to establish a Navy base at Samaná, in 1871 the treaty was defeated in the United States Senate through the efforts of abolitionist Senator Charles Sumner.

In 1874, the Rojo governor of Puerto Plata, Ignacio Maria González Santín, staged a coup in support of an Azul rebellion but was deposed by the Azules two years later. In February 1876, Ulises Espaillat, backed by Luperón, was named president, but ten months later troops loyal to Báez returned him to power. One year later, a new rebellion allowed González to seize power, only to be deposed by Cesáreo Guillermo in September 1878, who was in turn deposed by Luperón in December 1879.

Ruling the country from his hometown of Puerto Plata, enjoying an economic boom due to increased tobacco exports to Germany, Luperón enacted a new constitution setting a two-year presidential term limit and providing for direct elections, suspended the semi-formal system of bribes and initiated construction on the nation's first railroad, linking the town of La Vega with the port of Sánchez on Samaná Bay.

The Ten Years' War in Cuba brought Cuban sugar planters to the country in search of new lands and security from the insurrection that freed their slaves and destroyed their property. Most settled in the southeastern coastal plain, and, with assistance from Luperón's government, built the nation's first mechanized sugar mills. They were later joined by Italians, Germans, Puerto Ricans and Americans in forming the nucleus of the Dominican sugar bourgeoisie, marrying into prominent families to solidify their social position.

Disruptions in global production caused by the Ten Years' War, the American Civil War and the Franco-Prussian War allowed the Dominican Republic to become a major sugar exporter. Over the following two decades, sugar surpassed tobacco as the leading export, with the former fishing hamlets of San Pedro de Macorís and La Romana transformed into thriving ports. To meet their need for better transportation, over 300 miles of private rail-lines were built by and serving the sugar plantations by 1897.

An 1884 slump in prices led to a wage freeze, and a subsequent labor shortage was filled by migrant workers from the Leeward Islands—the Virgin Islands, St. Kitts and Nevis, Anguilla, and Antigua (referred to by Dominicans as cocolos). These English-speaking blacks were often victims of racism, but many remained in the country, finding work as stevedores and in railroad construction and sugar refineries.

Ulises Heureaux and U.S. protectorate 

Allying with the emerging sugar interests, the dictatorship of General Ulises Heureaux, who was popularly known as Lilís, brought unprecedented stability to the island through an iron-fisted rule that lasted almost two decades. The son of a Haitian father and a mother from St. Thomas, Virgin Islands, Lilís was distinguished by his blackness from most Dominican political leaders, with the exception of Luperón. He served as President 1882–1883, 1887, and 1889–1899, wielding power through a series of puppet presidents when not occupying the office. Incorporating both Rojos and Azules into his government, he developed an extensive network of spies and informants to crush potential opposition. His government undertook a number of major infrastructure projects, including the electrification of Santo Domingo, the beginning of telephone and telegraph service, the construction of a bridge over the Ozama River, and the completion of a single-track railroad linking Santiago and Puerto Plata, financed by the Amsterdam-based Westendorp Co.

Lilís's dictatorship was dependent upon heavy borrowing from European and American banks to enrich himself, stabilize the existing debt, strengthen the bribe system, pay for the army, finance infrastructural development and help set up sugar mills. However, sugar prices underwent a steep decline in the last two decades of the 19th century. When the Westendorp Co. went bankrupt in 1893, he was forced to mortgage the nation's customs fees, the main source of government revenues, to a New York financial firm called the San Domingo Improvement Co. (SDIC), which took over its railroad contracts and the claims of its European bondholders in exchange for two loans, one of $1.2 million and the other of £2 million.

As the growing public debt made it impossible to maintain his political machine, Heureaux relied on secret loans from the SDIC, sugar planters and local merchants. In 1897, with his government virtually bankrupt, Lilís printed five million uninsured pesos, known as papeletas de Lilís, ruining most Dominican merchants and inspiring a conspiracy that ended in his death. In 1899, when Lilís was assassinated by the Cibao tobacco merchants whom he had been begging for a loan, the national debt was over $35 million, fifteen times the annual budget.

The six years after Lilís's death witnessed four revolutions and five different presidents. The Cibao politicians who had conspired against Heureaux—Juan Isidro Jimenes, the nation's wealthiest tobacco planter, and General Horacio Vásquez—after being named president and Vice-President, quickly fell out over the division of spoils among their supporters, the Jimenistas and Horacistas.

Troops loyal to Vásquez overthrew Jimenes in 1903, but Vásquez was deposed by Jimenista General Alejandro Woss y Gil, who seized power for himself. The Jimenistas toppled his government, but their leader, Carlos Morales, refused to return power to Jimenes, allying with the Horacistas, and he soon faced a new revolt by his betrayed Jimenista allies. During the revolt, American warships bombarded insurgents in Santo Domingo for insulting the United States flag and damaging an American steamer.

With the nation on the brink of defaulting, France, Germany, Italy and the Netherlands sent warships to Santo Domingo to press the claims of their nationals. In order to preempt military intervention, United States president Theodore Roosevelt introduced the Roosevelt Corollary to the Monroe Doctrine, declaring that the United States would assume responsibility for ensuring that the nations of Latin America met their financial obligations.

In January 1905, under this corollary, the United States assumed administration of the Dominican Republic's customs. Under the terms of this agreement, a Receiver-General, appointed by the U.S. president, kept 55% of total revenues to pay off foreign claimants, while remitting 45% to the Dominican government. After two years, the nation's external debt was reduced from $40 million to $17 million. In 1907, this agreement was converted into a treaty, transferring control over customs receivership to the U.S. Bureau of Insular Affairs and providing a loan of $20 million from a New York bank as payment for outstanding claims, making the United States the Dominican Republic's only foreign creditor. In 1905, the Dominican Peso was replaced by the U.S. Dollar.

In 1906, Morales resigned, and Horacista vice-president Ramón Cáceres became president. After suppressing a rebellion in the northwest by Jimenista General Desiderio Arias, his government brought political stability and renewed economic growth, aided by new American investment in the sugar industry.

However, his assassination in 1911, for which Morales and Arias were at least indirectly responsible, once again plunged the republic into chaos. For two months, executive power was held by a civilian junta dominated by the chief of the army, General Alfredo Victoria. The surplus of more than 4 million pesos left by Cáceres was quickly spent to suppress a series of insurrections. He forced Congress to elect his uncle, Eladio Victoria, as president, but the latter was soon replaced by the neutral Archbishop Adolfo Nouel. After four months, Nouel resigned and was succeeded by Horacista Congressman José Bordas Valdez, who aligned with Arias and the Jimenistas to maintain power. 

In 1913, Vásquez returned from exile in Puerto Rico to lead a new rebellion. In June 1914, U.S. President Woodrow Wilson issued an ultimatum for the two sides to end hostilities and agree on a new president, or have the United States impose one. After the provisional presidency of Ramón Báez, Jimenes was elected in October, and soon faced new demands, including the appointment of an American director of public works and financial advisor and the creation of a new military force commanded by U.S. officers. The Dominican Congress rejected these demands and began impeachment proceedings against Jimenes.

The United States occupied Haiti in July 1915, with the implicit threat that the Dominican Republic might be next. Jimenes's Minister of War Desiderio Arias staged a coup d'état in April 1916, providing a pretext for the United States to occupy the Dominican Republic.

United States occupation: 1916–1924

Conventional campaign

United States Marines landed in Santo Domingo on May 15, 1916. Prior to their landing, Jimenes resigned, refusing to exercise an office "regained with foreign bullets". On June 1, Marines occupied Monte Cristi and Puerto Plata.

On June 26, a column of Marines under Colonel Joseph H. Pendleton marched toward Arias's stronghold of Santiago. Along the way, Dominicans tore up the railroad tracks, forcing Marines to walk; they also burned bridges, delaying the march. Twenty-four miles into the march, the Marines encountered Las Trencheras, two fortified ridges the Dominicans had long thought invulnerable: the Spanish had been defeated there in 1864. At 08:00 hours on June 27, Pendleton ordered his artillery to pound the ridgeline. Machine guns offered covering fire. A bayonet attack cleared the first ridge. Rifle fire removed the rebels who were threatening from atop the second.

A week later, the Marines encountered another entrenched rebel force at Guayacanas. The rebels kept up single-shot fire against the automatic weapons of the Marines before the Marines drove them off. With his supporters defeated, Arias surrendered on July 5 in exchange for being pardoned.

Occupation

The Dominican Congress elected Dr. Francisco Henríquez y Carvajal as president, but in November, after he refused to meet the U.S. demands, Wilson announced the imposition of a U.S. military government, with Rear Admiral Harry Shepard Knapp as Military Governor.

At San Francisco de Macorís, Governor Juan Pérez, a supporter of Arias, refused to recognize the U.S. military government. Using some 300 released prisoners, he was preparing to defend the old Spanish colonial structure, the Fortazela. On November 29, U.S. Marine Lt. Ernest C. Williams, whose detachment was billeted in San Francisco, charged the closing gates of the fort at nightfall with twelve Marines. Eight were shot down; the others, including Williams, forced their way in and seized the old structure. Another Marine detachment seized the police station. Reinforcements from nearby detachments soon suppressed the uprising.

The American military government implemented many of the institutional reforms carried out in the United States during the Progressive Era, including reorganization of the tax system, accounting and administration, expansion of primary education, the creation of a nationwide police force to unify the country, and the construction of a national system of roads, including a highway linking Santiago to Santo Domingo.

Despite the reforms, virtually all Dominicans resented the loss of their sovereignty to foreigners, few of whom spoke Spanish or displayed much real concern for the nation's welfare, and the military government, unable to win the backing of any prominent Dominican political leaders, imposed strict censorship laws and imprisoned critics of the occupation. In 1920, U.S. authorities enacted a Land Registration Act, which broke up the terrenos comuneros and dispossessed thousands of peasants who lacked formal titles to the lands they occupied, while legalizing false titles held by the sugar companies. In the southeast, dispossessed peasants formed armed bands, called gavilleros, waging a guerrilla war that lasted six years, with most of the fighting in Hato Mayor and El Seibo. At any given time, the Marines faced eight to twelve such bands each composed of several hundred followers. The guerrillas benefited from a superior knowledge of the terrain and the support of the local population, and the Marines relied on superior firepower. However, rivalries between various gavilleros often led them to fight against one another, and even cooperate with occupation authorities. In addition, cultural schisms between the campesinos (i.e. rural people, or peasants) and city dwellers prevented the guerrillas from cooperating with the urban middle-class nationalist movement.

U.S. Marines and Dominican bandits led by Vicente Evangelista clashed in eastern Dominican Republic beginning on January 10, 1917. In March 1917, Evangelista executed two American civilians, engineers from an American-owned plantation, who were lashed to trees, hacked with machetes, then left dangling for ravenous wild boars. Evangelista and 200 bandits surrendered to U.S. Marines in El Seibo on July 4, 1917. U.S. Marines shot and killed Evangelista as he was "attempting to escape" on July 6, 1917. The unrest in the eastern provinces lasted until 1922 when the guerrillas finally agreed to surrender in return for amnesty. The Marines' anti-bandit campaigns in the Dominican Republic were hot, often godlessly uncomfortable, and largely devoid of heroism and glory. Some 1,000 individuals, including 144 U.S. Marines, were killed during the conflict. (Forty U.S. sailors died separately when a hurricane wrecked their ship on Santo Domingo's rocky shore.)

In what was referred to as la danza de los millones, with the destruction of European sugar-beet farms during World War I, sugar prices rose to their highest level in history, from $5.50 in 1914 to $22.50 per pound in 1920. Dominican sugar exports increased from 122,642 tons in 1916 to 158,803 tons in 1920, earning a record $45.3 million. However, European beet sugar production quickly recovered, which, coupled with the growth of global sugar cane production, glutted the world market, causing prices to plummet to only $2.00 by the end of 1921. This crisis drove many of the local sugar planters into bankruptcy, allowing large U.S. conglomerates to dominate the sugar industry. By 1926, only twenty-one major estates remained, occupying an estimated . Of these, twelve U.S.-owned companies owned more than 81% of this total area. While the foreign planters who had built the sugar industry integrated into Dominican society, these corporations expatriated their profits to the United States. As prices declined, sugar estates increasingly relied on Haitian laborers. This was facilitated by the military government's introduction of regulated contract labor, the growth of sugar production in the southwest, near the Haitian border, and a series of strikes by cocolo cane cutters organized by the Universal Negro Improvement Association.

Withdrawal

In the 1920 United States presidential election Republican candidate Warren Harding criticized the occupation and promised eventual U.S. withdrawal. While Jimenes and Vásquez sought concessions from the United States, the collapse of sugar prices discredited the military government and gave rise to a new nationalist political organization, the Dominican National Union, led by Dr. Henríquez from exile in Santiago de Cuba, Cuba, which demanded unconditional withdrawal. They formed alliances with frustrated nationalists in Puerto Rico and Cuba, as well as critics of the occupation in the United States itself, most notably The Nation and the Haiti-San Domingo Independence Society. In May 1922, a Dominican lawyer, Francisco Peynado, went to Washington, D.C. and negotiated what became known as the Hughes–Peynado Plan. It stipulated the immediate establishment of a provisional government pending elections, approval of all laws enacted by the U.S. military government, and the continuation of the 1907 treaty until all the Dominican Republic's foreign debts had been settled. On October 1, Juan Bautista Vicini, the son of a wealthy Italian immigrant sugar planter, was named provisional president, and the process of U.S. withdrawal began. The principal legacy of the occupation was the creation of a National Police Force, used by the Marines to help fight against the various guerrillas, and later the main vehicle for the rise of Rafael Trujillo.

The rise and fall of Trujillo: Third Republic 1924–1965

Horacio Vásquez 1924–1930

The occupation ended in 1924, with a democratically elected government under president Vásquez. The Vásquez administration brought great social and economic prosperity to the country and respected political and civil rights. Rising export commodity prices and government borrowing allowed the funding of public works projects and the expansion and modernization of Santo Domingo.

Though considered to be a relatively principled man, Vásquez had risen amid many years of political infighting. In a move directed against his chief opponent Federico Velasquez, in 1927 Vásquez agreed to have his term extended from four to six years. The change was approved by the Dominican Congress, but was of debatable legality; "its enactment effectively invalidated the constitution of 1924 that Vásquez had previously sworn to uphold." Vásquez also removed the prohibition against presidential reelection and postulated himself for another term in elections to be held in May 1930. However, his actions had by then led to doubts that the contest could be fair. Furthermore, these elections took place amid economic problems, as the Great Depression had dropped sugar prices to less than one dollar per pound.

In February, a revolution was proclaimed in Santiago by a lawyer named Rafael Estrella Ureña. When the commander of the Guardia Nacional Dominicana (the new designation of the armed force created under the Occupation), Rafael Leonidas Trujillo Molina, ordered his troops to remain in their barracks, the sick and aging Vásquez was forced into exile and Estrella proclaimed provisional president. In May, Trujillo was elected with 95% of the vote, having used the army to harass and intimidate electoral personnel and potential opponents. After his inauguration in August, at his request, the Dominican Congress proclaimed the beginning of the 'Era of Trujillo'.

The era of Trujillo 1931–1961

Trujillo established absolute political control while promoting economic development—from which mainly he and his supporters benefitted—and severe repression of domestic human rights. Trujillo treated his political party, El Partido Dominicano (The Dominican Party), as a rubber-stamp for his decisions. The true source of his power was the Guardia Nacional—larger, better armed, and more centrally controlled than any military force in the nation's history. By disbanding the regional militias, the Marines eliminated the main source of potential opposition, giving the Guard "a virtual monopoly on power". By 1940, Dominican military spending was 21% of the national budget. At the same time, he developed an elaborate system of espionage agencies. By the late 1950s, there were at least seven categories of intelligence agencies, spying on each other as well as the public. All citizens were required to carry identification cards and good-conduct passes from the secret police.

Obsessed with adulation, Trujillo promoted an extravagant cult of personality. When a hurricane struck Santo Domingo in 1930, killing over 3,000 people, he rebuilt the city and renamed it Ciudad Trujillo: "Trujillo City"; he also renamed the country's and the Caribbean's highest mountain, Pico Duarte (Duarte Peak), Pico Trujillo. Over 1,800 statues of Trujillo were built, and all public works projects were required to have a plaque with the inscription "Era of Trujillo, Benefactor of the Fatherland".

As sugar estates turned to Haiti for seasonal migrant labor, increasing numbers settled in the Dominican Republic permanently. The census of 1920, conducted by the U.S. occupation government, gave a total of 28,258 Haitians living in the country; by 1935 there were 52,657.
In September 1937, Trujillo welcomed a Nazi delegation and publicly accepted the gift of Adolf Hitler's Mein Kampf. The following month, Trujillo ordered the massacre of up to 67,000 Haitian men, women, and children living in the Cibao region, the alleged justification being Haiti's support for Dominican exiles plotting to overthrow his regime. Over the course of five days, Dominican troops, who came mostly from other areas of the country, killed Haitians with guns, machetes, clubs, and knives. Haitian women were stabbed and mutilated, babies bayoneted, and men tied up and thrown into the sea, where sharks finished what Trujillo had begun. This event later became known as the Parsley Massacre because of the story that Dominican soldiers identified Haitians by their inability to pronounce the Spanish word perejil. A shocked American missionary, Father Barnes, wrote about the massacre in a letter to his sister. Trujillo's spies intercepted the letter. Father Barnes was found on the floor of his home, murdered brutally.

The massacre was the result of a new policy which Trujillo called the 'Dominicanisation of the frontier'. Place names along the border were changed from Creole and French to Spanish, the practice of Voodoo was outlawed, quotas were imposed on the percentage of foreign workers that companies could hire, and a law was passed preventing Haitian workers from remaining after the sugar harvest.

Although Trujillo sought to emulate Generalissimo Francisco Franco, he welcomed Spanish Republican refugees following the Spanish Civil War. During the Holocaust in the Second World War, the Dominican Republic took in many Jews fleeing Hitler who had been refused entry by other countries. The Jews settled in Sosua. These decisions arose from a policy of blanquismo, closely connected with anti-Haitian xenophobia, which sought to add more light-skinned individuals to the Dominican population by promoting immigration from Europe. As part of the Good Neighbor policy, in 1940, the U.S. State Department signed a treaty with Trujillo relinquishing control over the nation's customs. When the Japanese attacked Pearl Harbor Trujillo followed the United States in declaring war on the Axis powers, although the Dominican Republic did not have any participation in the war. During the Cold War, he maintained close ties to the United States, declaring himself the world's "Number One Anticommunist" and becoming the first Latin American President to sign a Mutual Defense Assistance Agreement with the United States.

Ramfis (the dictator's son) and Porfirio Rubirosa became a major part of the Rafael Trujillo regime's image in the foreign press, as a result of their lavish lifestyle and relationships with Hollywood actresses.

Trujillo and his family established a near-monopoly over the national economy. He exploited nationalist sentiment to purchase most of the nation's sugar plantations and refineries from U.S. corporations; operated monopolies on salt, rice, milk, cement, tobacco, coffee, and insurance; owned two large banks, several hotels, port facilities, an airline and shipping line; deducted 10% of all public employees' salaries (ostensibly for his party); and received a portion of prostitution revenues.

World War II brought increased demand for Dominican exports, and the 1940s and early 1950s witnessed economic growth and considerable expansion of the national infrastructure. During this period, the capital city was transformed from merely an administrative center to the national center of shipping and industry, although "it was hardly coincidental that new roads often led to Trujillo's plantations and factories, and new harbors benefited Trujillo's shipping and export enterprises." Mismanagement and corruption resulted in major economic problems. By the end of the 1950s, the economy was deteriorating because of a combination of overspending on a festival to celebrate the 25th anniversary of the regime, overspending to purchase privately owned sugar mills and electricity plants, and a decision to make a major investment in state sugar production that proved economically unsuccessful.

In 1956, Trujillo's agents in New York murdered Jesús María de Galíndez, a Basque exile who had worked for Trujillo but who later denounced the Trujillo regime and caused public opinion in the United States to turn against Trujillo.

In 1957, Trujillo created the Military Intelligence Service, secret police, headed by Johnny Abbes García, who briefly operated in Cuba, Mexico, Guatemala, New York, Costa Rica, and Venezuela.

On June 14, 1959, leftist Dominican exiles launched an invasion of the Dominican Republic from Cuba with the hope of overthrowing the Trujillo regime. Trujillo's forces quickly routed the invaders at Constanza. A week later, another group of invaders in two yachts were intercepted on the north coast and blasted by mortar fire and bazookas from the shore. Trujillo's planes, operating from San Isidro, zoomed low over the yachts and shot rockets, killing most of the invaders. A few survivors managed to swim to the shore and escape into the forest; the military used napalm to get them out. Of a count of 224 invaders, 217 were killed and seven captured. The leaders of the invasion were taken aboard a Dominican Air Force plane and then pushed out in mid-air, falling to their deaths.

In August 1960, the Organization of American States (OAS) imposed diplomatic sanctions against the Dominican Republic as a result of Trujillo's complicity in an attempt to assassinate Venezuelan president Rómulo Betancourt with a car bomb. Betancourt had been involved in the 1959 Cuba-based invasion of the Dominican Republic.

The United States broke diplomatic relations with the Dominican Republic on August 26, 1960, and in January 1961 suspended the export of trucks, parts, crude oil, gasoline and other petroleum products. U.S. President Dwight D. Eisenhower also took advantage of OAS sanctions to cut drastically purchases of Dominican sugar. This action ultimately cost the Dominican Republic almost $22,000,000 in lost revenues at a time when its economy was in a rapid decline. Trujillo threatened to align with the Communist world in response to U.S. and Latin American rejection of his regime. La Voz Dominicana and Radio Caribe began attacking the U.S. in Marxian terms, and the Dominican Communist Party was legalized. The United States government turned to the Central Intelligence Agency to devise a plan to kill Trujillo.

A group of Dominican dissidents killed Trujillo in a car chase on the way to his country villa near San Cristóbal on May 30, 1961. The group was led by General Juan Tomás Díaz Quezada. The assassins riddled Trujillo's car with almost thirty bullets. Trujillo's chauffeur attempted to return fire with a machine gun. Badly wounded, Trujillo scrambled out of the car, looking for the assassins, and was shot down, dying on the spot.

The sanctions remained in force after Trujillo's assassination. His son Ramfis took charge and rounded up the conspirators; they were summarily executed, some of them being fed to sharks. In November 1961, the military plot of the Rebellion of the Pilots forced the Trujillo family into exile, fleeing to France, and the heretofore puppet-president Joaquín Balaguer assumed effective power.

The post-Trujillo instability 1961–1965
At the insistence of the United States, Balaguer was forced to share power with a seven-member Council of State, established on January 1, 1962, and including moderate members of the opposition. OAS sanctions were lifted January 4, and, after an attempted coup, Balaguer resigned and went into exile on January 16. The reorganized Council of State, under President Rafael Filiberto Bonnelly headed the Dominican government until elections could be held. These elections, in December 1962, were won by Juan Bosch, a scholar and poet who had founded the opposition Partido Revolucionario Dominicano (Dominican Revolutionary Party, or PRD) in exile, during the Trujillo years. His leftist policies, including land redistribution, nationalization of certain foreign holdings, and attempts to bring the military under civilian control, antagonized the military officer corps, the Catholic hierarchy, and the upper-class, who feared "another Cuba".

In September 1963, Bosch was overthrown by a right-wing military coup led by Colonel Elías Wessin and was replaced by a three-man military junta. Bosch went into exile to Puerto Rico.  Afterwards, a supposedly civilian triumvirate established a de facto dictatorship.

Dominican Civil War and second United States occupation 1965–66

On April 16, 1965, growing dissatisfaction generated another military rebellion on April 24, 1965 that demanded Bosch's restoration. The insurgents, reformist officers and civilian combatants loyal to Bosch commanded by Colonel Francisco Caamaño, and who called themselves the Constitutionalists, staged a coup, seizing the national palace. Immediately, conservative military forces, led by Wessin and calling themselves Loyalists, struck back with tank assaults and aerial bombings against Santo Domingo.

Strafing by the airplanes on the Duarte Bridge killed 200 civilians, and bombing shattered many of the buildings and structures to the west. Outwardly the damage west of the bridge seemed impressive with body parts scattered on the streets. On April 27, a sizeable Loyalist force of tanks, armored cars, artillery, and infantry began to rumble across Duarte Bridge under covering fire from 12.7 mm machine guns on the eastern bank. The Constitutionalists left two large truck trailers blocking the path, but as the Loyalist armor pushed its way through these obstacles, one of the two pre–World War I 75 mm cannon on the Constitutionalist side got off one shot and destroyed the first tank. Soon a hail of machine gun fire silenced the 75 mm cannons and the rest of the tanks proceeded into the city. When the armored column passed José Martí Street one block from Duarte Avenue, armed civilians attacked the Loyalist infantry and unleashed a hail of fire from machine guns and mortars; most of the troops either fled or were killed. Without infantry support, the unescorted tanks, already in the narrow streets of the neighborhood, were easy targets for the Molotov cocktails soon being tossed from the surrounding buildings. The Loyalists were routed and several tanks were abandoned and put into use by the rebels.

On April 28, the anti-Bosch army elements requested U.S. military intervention and U.S. forces landed, ostensibly to protect U.S. citizens and to evacuate U.S. and other foreign nationals. A rebel sniper killed a Marine near the U.S. embassy, and in the ensuing crossfire a hand grenade fatally wounded a Dominican girl. The evacuation was completed without further loss of life. U.S. President Lyndon B. Johnson, convinced of the defeat of the Loyalist forces and fearing the creation of "a second Cuba" on America's doorstep, ordered U.S. forces to restore order. In what was initially known as Operation Power Pack, 27,677 U.S. troops were ultimately ordered to the Dominican Republic.

Denied a military victory, the Constitutionalist rebels quickly had a Constitutionalist congress elect Caamaño president of the country. U.S. officials countered by backing General Antonio Imbert. On May 7, Imbert was sworn in as president of the Government of National Reconstruction. The next step in the stabilization process, as envisioned by Washington and the OAS, was to arrange an agreement between President Caamaño and President Imbert to form a provisional government committed to early elections. However, Caamaño refused to meet with Imbert until several of the Loyalist officers, including Wessin y Wessin, were made to leave the country.

On May 13, Imbert launched an eight-day offensive to eliminate rebel resistance in the northern sector. Meanwhile, U.S. troops advanced towards the El Timbeque neighborhood, in order to take over a power plant, but were repulsed by the Constitutionalists. Imbert's forces took the northern part of the capital, destroying many buildings and killing many civilians. A cease-fire was negotiated by May 21, marking the beginning of neutrality for U.S. forces. At this time, 20 Americans had been killed in action and 102 wounded.

By May 14, the Americans had established a "safety corridor" connecting the San Isidro Air Base and the "Duarte" Bridge to the Embajador Hotel and United States Embassy in the center of Santo Domingo, essentially sealing off the Constitutionalist area of Santo Domingo. Roadblocks were established and patrols ran continuously. Some 6,500 people from many nations were evacuated to safety. In addition, the US forces airlifted in relief supplies for Dominican nationals.

By mid-May, a majority of the OAS voted for Operation "Push Ahead", the reduction of United States forces and their replacement by an Inter-American Peace Force (IAPF). The Inter-American Peace Force was formally established on May 23. The following troops were sent by each country: Brazil – 1,130, Honduras – 250, Paraguay – 184, Nicaragua – 160, Costa Rica – 21 military police, and El Salvador – 3 staff officers. The first contingent to arrive was a rifle company from Honduras which was soon backed by detachments from Costa Rica, El Salvador, and Nicaragua. Brazil provided the largest unit, a reinforced infantry battalion. Brazilian General Hugo Panasco Alvim assumed command of the OAS ground forces, and on May 26 the U.S. forces began to withdraw.

On June 15, Camaaño hurled all his best remaining units and weapons against the American lines, and soon mortar rounds were hitting the 82nd Airborne Division. Although their heaviest weapons were recoilless cannons, the 82nd Airborne soundly defeated the rebels. The fighting cost the U.S. five killed and thirty-one wounded, three of whom later died. The Brazilians, who had orders to remain on the defensive, suffered five wounded. The Constitutionalists (mostly armed civilians) lost sixty-seven killed.

The mauling the Constitutionalists received on the 15th made them more amenable, but not yet committed, to a negotiated settlement. The fighting continued until August 31, 1965, when a truce was declared. Most American troops left shortly afterwards as policing and peacekeeping operations were turned over to Brazilian troops, but some U.S. military presence remained until September 1966. On September 14, two members of a support unit attached to the 82nd were ambushed by civilians riding motorcycles. Both were shot in the back. One G.I. died instantly; the other died at a hospital.

A total of 44 American soldiers died, 27 in action; 172 were wounded in action, as were six Brazilians and five Paraguayans. An estimated 1,425 Dominican soldiers and police died.

Fourth Republic 1966–present

Balaguer's second Presidency 1966–1978 
In June 1966, Joaquín Balaguer, leader of the Reformist Party (which later became the Social Christian Reformist Party (PRSC)), was elected and then re-elected to office in May 1970 and May 1974, both times after the major opposition parties withdrew late in the campaign because of the high degree of violence by pro-government groups. On November 28, 1966 a constitution was created, signed, and put into effect. The constitution stated that the president was elected to a four-year term. If there was a close election there would be a second round of voting to decide the winner. The voting age was eighteen, but married people under eighteen could also vote.

On one hand, Balaguer was considered to be a caudillo who led a regime of terror where 11,000 victims were either tortured or forcibly disappeared and killed. However, Balaguer was also considered to be a major reformer who was instrumental in the liberalization of the Dominican government. During his time as President of the Dominican Republic, the country saw major changes such as legalized political activities, surprise army promotions and demotions, promoting health and education improvements and the instituting of modest land reforms.

Balaguer led the Dominican Republic through a thorough economic restructuring, based on opening the country to foreign investment while protecting state-owned industries and certain private interests. This distorted, dependent development model produced uneven results. For most of Balaguer's first nine years in office the country experienced high growth rates (e.g., an average GDP growth rate of 9.4% between 1970 and 1975), to the extent that people talked about the "Dominican miracle". Foreign, mostly U.S. investment, as well as foreign aid, flowed into the country. Sugar, then the country's main export product, enjoyed good prices in the international market, and tourism grew tremendously. As part of Balaguer's land reform policies, land was dished out to peasants among the country's rural population.

However, this excellent macroeconomic performance was not accompanied by an equitable distribution of wealth in some other areas of the country. While a group of new millionaires flourished during Balaguer's administrations, some of the poor simply became poorer. Moreover, some of the poor were commonly the target of state repression, and their socioeconomic claims were labeled 'communist' and dealt with accordingly by the state security apparatus.  In the May 1978 election, Balaguer was defeated in his bid for a fourth successive term by Antonio Guzmán Fernández of the PRD. Balaguer then ordered troops to storm the election centre and destroy ballot boxes, declaring himself the victor. U.S. President Jimmy Carter refused to recognize Balaguer's claim, and, faced with the loss of foreign aid, Balaguer stepped down.

Guzmán / Blanco interregnum 1978–1986
Guzmán's inauguration on August 16 marked the country's first peaceful transfer of power from one freely elected president to another.

Hurricane David hit the Dominican Republic in August 1979, which caused over $1 billion in damage.

By the late 1970s, economic expansion slowed considerably as sugar prices declined and oil prices rose. Rising inflation and unemployment diminished support for the government and helped trigger a wave of mass emigration from the Dominican Republic to New York, coming on the heels of the similar migration of Puerto Ricans in the preceding decades.

Guzmán committed suicide on July 5th, 1982 a month before he would have left office. He was confronted with evidence of his daughter Sonia Guzmán's husband's corruption using her father's position for monetary gain. Guzmán was known as a serious man who never stole money. After being confronted with this, he entered his bathroom and shot himself.

Elections were again held in 1982. Salvador Jorge Blanco of the Dominican Revolutionary Party defeated Bosch and a resurgent Balaguer.

Balaguer's third Presidency 1986–1996
Balaguer completed his return to power in 1986 when he won the Presidency again and remained in office for the next ten years. Elections in 1990 were marked by violence and suspected electoral fraud. The 1994 election too saw widespread pre-election violence, often aimed at intimidating members of the opposition. Balaguer won in 1994 but most observers felt the election had been stolen. Under pressure from the United States, Balaguer agreed to hold new elections in 1996. He himself would not run.

Since 1996

Fernández: First administration 1996–2000
In 1996, U.S.-raised Leonel Fernández Reyna  of Bosch's Partido de la Liberación Dominicana (Dominican Liberation Party) secured more than 51% of the vote, through an alliance with Balaguer. The first item on the president's agenda was the partial sale of some state-owned enterprises. Fernández was praised for ending decades of isolationism and improving ties with other Caribbean countries, but he was criticized for not fighting corruption or alleviating the poverty that affected 60% of the population.

Mejía's administration 2000–2004
In May 2000 the center-left Hipólito Mejía of the PRD was elected president amid popular discontent over power outages in the recently privatized electric industry. His presidency saw major inflation and instability of the peso in 2003 because of the bankruptcy of three major commercial banks in the country due to the bad policies of the principal managers. During his remaining time as president, he took action to save most savers of the closed banks, avoiding a major crisis. The relatively stable currency fell from about 16 Dominican pesos to 1 United States dollar to about 60 DOP to US$1 and was in the 40s to the dollar when he left office in August 2004. In the May 2004 presidential elections, he was defeated by former president Leonel Fernández.

Fernández: Second administration 2004–2012
Fernández instituted austerity measures to deflate the peso and rescue the country from its economic crisis, and in the first half of 2006, the economy grew 11.7%. The peso is currently (2019) at the exchange rate of c. 52 DOP to US$1.

Over the last three decades, remittances (remesas) from Dominicans living abroad, mainly in the United States, have become increasingly important to the economy. From 1990 to 2000, the Dominican population of the U.S. doubled in size, from 520,121 in 1990 to 1,041,910, two-thirds of whom were born in the Dominican Republic itself. More than half of all Dominican Americans live in New York City, with the largest concentration in the neighborhood of Washington Heights in northern Manhattan. Over the past decade, the Dominican Republic has become the largest source of immigration to New York City, and today the metropolitan area of New York has a larger Dominican population than any city except Santo Domingo. Dominican communities have also developed in New Jersey (particularly Paterson), Miami, Boston, Philadelphia, Providence, Rhode Island, and Lawrence, Massachusetts. In addition, tens of thousands of Dominicans and their descendants live in Puerto Rico. Many Dominicans arrive in Puerto Rico illegally by sea across the Mona Passage, some staying and some moving on to the mainland U.S. (See Dominican immigration to Puerto Rico.) Dominicans living abroad sent an estimated $3 billion in remittances to relatives at home, in 2006. In 1997, a new law took effect, allowing Dominicans living abroad to retain their citizenship and vote in presidential elections. President Fernández, who grew up in New York, was the principal beneficiary of this law.

The Dominican Republic was involved in the US-led coalition in Iraq, as part of the Spain-led Latin-American Plus Ultra Brigade. But in 2004, the nation pulled its 300 or so troops out of Iraq.

Danilo Medina's administration 2012–2020
Danilo Medina began his tenure with a series of controversial tax reforms so as to deal with the government's troublesome fiscal situation encountered by the new administration. In 2012, he had won presidency as the candidate of ruling Dominican Liberation Party (PLD).
In 2016, President Medina won re-election, defeating the main opposition candidate  businessman Luis Abinader, with a wide margin.

Luis Abinader 2020-present
In 2020 Luis Abinader, the presidential candidate for the opposition Modern Revolutionary Party (PRM) won the election and he became the new president, ending the 16-year rule of PLD since 2004.

See also
History of Haiti
History of Latin America
History of North America
History of the Americas
History of the Caribbean
List of presidents of the Dominican Republic
Politics of the Dominican Republic
Spanish colonization of the Americas
Timeline of Santo Domingo (city)

Notes

References

Further reading
 Betances, Emelio. State and society in the Dominican Republic (Routledge, 2018).
 Derby, Robin. The Dictator's Seduction: Politics and the Popular Imagination in the Era of Trujillo. Durham: Duke University Press 2008.
 Pons, Frank Moya. The Dominican Republic: a national history (Markus Wiener Publishers, 2010).
 Tillman, Ellen D. Dollar Diplomacy by Force: Nation-Building and Resistance in the Dominican Republic (UNC Press Books, 2016).
 Turits, Richard Lee. Foundations of Despotism: Peasants, the Trujillo Regime, and Modernity in Dominican History. Stanford: Stanford University Press 2003.
 Wiarda, Howard J., and Michael J. Kryzanek. The Dominican Republic: A Caribbean Crucible. (Routledge, 2019).
 "The Dominican Republic," History Today (Nov 1965) 15#11 pp 770–779, diplomatic history 1482–1965.

External links
Map of the Dominican Republic from 1910
Betances, Emelio. "The Dominican Grassroots Movement and the Organized Left, 1978–1986". Science & Society 79.3 (July 2015), 388–413.
"The Political Force of Images", Vistas: Visual Culture in Spanish America, 1520–1820.

History of Hispaniola
History of the Dominican Republic
History of the Caribbean
Spanish West Indies